Mordellistena mexicana is a species of beetle in the genus Mordellistena of the family Mordellidae. It was discovered in 1915.

References

mexicana